Granite Reliable Wind Farm is a 99-megawatt wind farm, opened in 2011 in Millsfield and Dixville, New Hampshire, in the northeast United States. Owned by Brookfield Renewable, it is the second major wind-power installation in the state of New Hampshire. Most of the electricity generated will be sold to utilities in Vermont, Central Vermont Public Service and Green Mountain Power. Power from the wind turbines is connected through three 34.5 kV lines to a substation and from there through a 115 kV line. The wind farm was constructed by Madison, Wisconsin-based RMT Inc.

Located in Millsfield and Dixville, in Coos County, it has 33 V90-3.0 MW Vestas turbines wind turbines, in four sections, with seven wind turbines on Dixville Peak, eight located on Mount Kelsey, six on Owlhead Mountain, and 12 wind turbines along Fishbrook Ridge. It was originally developed by Noble Energy, and sold to Brookfield.

References

External links

 Economic Impact Study, UNH
 NH SEC Application

Energy infrastructure completed in 2011
Buildings and structures in Coös County, New Hampshire
Wind farms in New Hampshire
2011 establishments in New Hampshire